Buddhism in Wales is followed by 0.3% of the Welsh population, according to the 2021 Census. Buddhism has a relatively short history, having only really established a presence in the country in the 20th Century. 10,075 people in Wales declared themselves Buddhist in the 2021 Census, representing a number of Buddhist traditions.

Denominations

Tibetan Buddhism is particularly well represented with branches of several different traditions and lineages, notably Lama Shenpen Hookham's Awakened Heart Sangha, based in North Wales. Zen Buddhism has several groups in Wales and three Soto Zen masters are currently resident and actively teaching. The Samatha Trust, a lay Theravada group, have their headquarters in Wales as does the Tibetan group, Awakened Heart Sangha. The Triratna Buddhist Community have a number of groups and a large Cardiff Buddhist Centre. The Nyingma Aro gTér Lineage has been active in Wales since 1981. The Aro gTér Lineage Holders, Ngak’chang Rinpoche and Khandro Déchen, are resident in Wales and have written many publications about Vajrayana Buddhist practice (see Aro Books worldwide and Aro Books Inc). Another Welsh author of this lineage is Ngakma Nor’dzin Pamo who is a teacher at Aro Ling Cardiff.

Buddhist Council of Wales

The Buddhist Council of Wales  has a growing number of Buddhist organisations and groups listed on their website. The Council is active in representing Buddhism and has two delegates on the National Assembly for Wales Faith Communities Forum and two on the Interfaith Council for Wales.

Notable Buddhists
Ricky Evans- former rugby star who converted to Buddhism.

See also
 Buddhism in Scotland
 Buddhism in England
 Buddhism in the United Kingdom
 Religion in Wales

References

External links
 Aro Ling Cardiff Buddhist group
 dashboard for Aro gTér Lineage sites
 Buddhist Council of Wales
 The Samatha Trust
 Hermitage of The Awakened Heart
 Lama Shenpen Hookham

 
Buddhism
Wal
Wal